Sanna Visser (born 2 May 1984 in Friesland) is a retired volleyball player from the Netherlands, who played in different positions. She was a member of the Dutch National Women's Team that won the gold medal at the FIVB World Grand Prix 2007 in Ningbo, China. After volleyball, Visser embarked on a corporate career.

References
FIVB Profile

1984 births
Living people
Dutch women's volleyball players
Sportspeople from Friesland
Sportspeople from Amsterdam